The International Festival of Cinema and Audiovisual of Burundi (FESTICAB) is an annual film festival held in Burundi. 

FESTICAB was established by the film director Léonce Ngabo in 2009. It comprises competitions in three categories: Burundian films, East African films and international films.

At the 2011 FESTICAB the East African Film Network (EAFN) was founded. The 2015 FESTICAB was disrupted by the protests against President Nkurunziza running for a third term, and many screenings needed to be cancelled.

FESTICAB winners
2010
 Best Burundian Work: Taxi-Love by Jean Marie Ndihokubwayo

2011
 Best Short Film: Mwansa the Great by Rungano Nyoni
 Special Jury Prize: Hasaki Ya Suda / Three Black Samura by Cédric Ido

2012
 Best Documentary: Justice for Sale

2014
 Best East African Short Film: Shoeshine by Amil Shivji 

2016
 Best East African Feature Film: Bahati by Timothy Conrad
 Best Short Film: VIRAL by Nifasha Florian  
2017
 Best Actor: Modo Emmanuel

References

External links
 FESTICAB website
 Festicab Channel

African film festivals
Cinema of Burundi
2009 establishments in Africa
Recurring events established in 2009